The Little Girl Who Fell From the Tree is a 1998 German thriller film written and directed by Michael Bartlett.  Bartlett directed the film in Berlin's Babelsberg Studio for Rialto Film Berlin.

The film made its debut at the AFI/Los Angeles International Film Festival on October 25, 1998 and won the Best Editing Award.

Cast 
 Dominique Horwitz - Ben
 Floriane Daniel - Jenny
 Julia Jäger - Lisa
 Dorothea Moritz - Frau Prack
 Ingo Naujoks - Leo
 Rainer Strecker - Vater
 Manfred Banach
  - Gynäkologin

References

External links 

1998 films
1998 thriller films
German thriller films
Films shot at Babelsberg Studios
1990s German-language films
1990s German films